The Palacio de Aldama is a neoclassical mansion located diagonally opposite to the old Plaza del Vapor (Parque del Curita), and in front of the old Campo de Marte; present day Parque de la Fraternidad, in Havana, Cuba. Built in 1840 by the Dominican architect and engineer Manuel José Carrera, its main facade of columns spans one block on Calle Amistad between Calles Reina and Estrella.

History

The Aldama Palace was assaulted by Spanish volunteers on the night of the January 24, 1869. Its owner at that time, Don Miguel de Aldama and Alfonso – son of the building's builder – was a recognized enemy of Spain and conspirator since Narciso López's time.  A man so rich and powerful that, despite his ideas and pro Cuban views, Spain, far from punishing him, wanted to attract him with the offer of the title of marquis; Don Miguel refused. In addition, there was another reason that prompted the most intransigent Spanish element, represented by the volunteers, to the looting of that mansion and was the insistent rumor that, by the will of its owner, that royal palace would be the residence of the future presidents of Cuba.

Thus, the Spanish Volunteer Corps assaulted the palace under the pretext that Domingo del Monte had a catch of weapons inside of the Palacio. The looting of the Aldama Palace, three months after the start of the first war for independence, is linked to various events that took place under the command of Captain General Domingo Dulce y Garay, Marquis of Castell-Florit, whose main cause was the encounter between the Spaniards and the Cubans and the hostility that the volunteers felt for the ruler whom they held as weak, and whom they accused of complicity in events contrary to Spain, including, those of Miguel Aldama.
Street riots had occurred on January 12 after the volunteers during a search had found a stash of weapons in a house on Calle Carmen during the burial of Camilo Cepeda, a young Cuban killed in jail. The Volunteers returned on the 24th and a troop of them fired their weapons into the ‘’El Louvre’’ cafe, those who tried to flee, were attacked by bayonet. There were seven dead and numerous wounded, all of them Spanish.

The Third and Fifth battalions, and the Ligeros battalion, concentrated before the Palace and knocked down one of the doors. They said to look for weapons and, indeed, they found them, but not of those that could be used in the manigua in the war against Spain, it was a collection of ancient weapons ——Japanese, Hindu, Norman, Inca, etc.—— that the Aldama family had collected. The Spanish Volunteers destroyed the art gallery and searched the cabinets and appropriated everything that could be taken, what could not be carried, they destroyed: crockery, lamps, crystals, books, art objects of all kinds. They set fire to the damask or lace curtains and doors and windows were torn off of the masonry, or shot. They also visited the wineries of the Palace, lit a bonfire in the Field of Mars and had the carved furniture and oriental tapestries burned.

Property confiscated

The Aldama mansion was in the care at that time of two or three servants who were the victims of the humiliation and mistreatment; the family was saved from the fury of the aggressors for not being in the house, an old English maid was stripped of her life's savings by volunteers. That January 24 was Sunday and, like all holidays, the Aldama family spent it at their Santa Rosa farm, in Matanzas. There, they received the news and also the threat that the farm would suffer the same fate. They did not delay in leaving the Island; all their properties were confiscated. In New York, Miguel Aldama assumed the direction of the General Agency of the Republic of Cuba in Arms and put at the service of his ideas what was left of his immense fortune. He died in 1888 in exile and in misery.

As a result of these events, it the Palace was confiscated by the colonial government until 1878 when, by the transitory pacification of the Island, by the Pact of Zanjón, it was returned to its owners. It has been affirmed that this palace was destined to be the seat of the government of the republic, mentioned in this regard in a phrase of the martyr Domingo Goicuría.

The looting caused much damage to the property, they only found weapons from the defendant's personal collection. As a result of this assault, Don Aldama left the country. After his death on April 11, 1870, a trial was commenced in Havana to determine if his heirs Miguel and Leonardo Aldama could inherit the property, it was an option denied by the colonial court, and as a result, the Aldana Palace passed on to the metropolitan government. With the signing of the Pact of the Zanjón, the Aldama family had their rights reinstated but never again was the palace occupied by its owners or any family member.

After the death of Don Miguel Aldama, the mansion was auctioned and the new owners installed the tobacco factory "La Corona," which was subsequently sold to the English company "The Havana Cigar and Tobacco Factories Limited," which modified the Palace by adding a third floor. In 1932 after a bloody tobacco strike the company closed the building and in 1945 it was planned to be demolished; by protest of cultural and artistic societies, it was saved and declared a National Monument on June 9, 1949, by decree. Prior to the Cuban Revolution, there was the Mendoza Mortgage Bank, and other private companies.

Architecture

Two houses

The Palacio de Aldama was built in 1840, and had two floors and a mezzanine; it is estimated that its cost was around one million pesos, a great sum for the time notes Dr. Juan de las Cuevas. The Aldama Palace is actually two adjoining houses, "treated as an architectural unit of exceptional monumentality." The larger house, that of Domingo Aldama and Arréchaga, located on the north side of the site, the other, that of his daughter Rosa who was married to the writer Domingo del Monte.Domingo del Monte was born in Maracaibo, Venezuela from a wealthy family, his parents were Leonardo del Monte y Medrano, an assistant and Lieutenant for the Governor in that city native of Santo Domingo, and Rosa Aponte y Sánchez, the daughter and heir of a known and influential planter. Del Monte attended preschool while living in Venezuela, before his parents moved to Dominican Republic, and thereafter to Cuba in 1810. A few years later, when Del Monte was a twelve-year-old, his parents enrolled him into the Seminary of San Carlos, a catholic alma mater of Leonardo Gamboa in the novel Cecilia Valdés by Cirilo Villaverde (1812–1894). He completed studies at the University of Havana and right after graduation, around the 1820s, he had a notable influence as an associate for a prominent lawyer in Havana, who shortly after, financed a trip throughout Europe and the United States for the young Del Monte. In April 1834, Del Monte married Rosa Aldama, the daughter of a wealthy planter named Miguel de Aldama. He proposed marriage to her on the Philharmonic Society salon. Rosa's father was Domingo de Aldama y Arechaga, ranked as the twelfth richest in an 1836 survey of the most wealthy Cubans.

The first house

The first house was designed by José Manuel Carrerá, an architect of Dominican origin and is linked to all his companies and the projects of the Alfonso family, which was his wife's, especially the railway network that both deployed in the province of Matanzas. The influence of Don Domingo Aldama is revealed in the fact that in order to authorize him to construct the Palace, the Spanish authorities repealed an order prohibiting civil constructions in the military zone; that is, adjacent to the Campo de Marte, although the Palace's front elevation was required to face that space.  Las Cuevas Toraya notes that it is a masonry house, even the interior partitions, and draws attention to the main staircase, built with Carrara marble blocks, the treads are adjusted to each other without any added external support.  The building has a dining room that was designed for more than one hundred people. The arcade has a height of two floors, covering the ground floor and the mezzanine. An upper deck is supported by the capital decorations, typical of neoclassical constructions, although it has some elements of the late Baroque and the Renaissance.

Ashlar

The Palacio de Aldama is constructed of ashlar stone masonry, a finely dressed (cut, worked) stone, either an individual stone that was worked until squared. Ashlar is the finest stone masonry unit, generally rectangular cuboid, mentioned by Vitruvius as opus isodomum, or less frequently trapezoidal. Precisely cut "on all faces adjacent to those of other stones", ashlar is capable of very thin joints between blocks, and the visible face of the stone may be quarry-faced or feature a variety of treatments: tooled, smoothly polished, or rendered with another material for decorative effect. Ashlar may be coursed, which involves lengthy horizontals layers of stone blocks laid in parallel, and therefore with continuous horizontal joints. Ashlar may also be random, which involves stone blocks laid with deliberately discontinuous courses and therefore discontinuous joints both vertically and horizontally. In either case, it generally uses a joining material such as mortar to bind the blocks together, although dry ashlar construction, metal ties, and other methods of assembly have been used.

Expropriation

In the 1960s, like many other properties in Havana, the Palacio de Aldama was confiscated and nationalized without any compensation.

Revolution
With the triumph of the Cuban Revolution, the building was assigned in 1965 to the Academy of Sciences. In 1968, the Institute of Ethnology and Folklore was installed in the Palacio which demolished the third floor and restored its original appearance. In 1974 the government turned the Palacio de Aldama over to the Institute for the Studies of Communism and Socialism. Finally, in 1987 it became the Instituto de Historia de Cuba.

See also
List of buildings in Havana
Neoclassical architecture
Parque de la Fraternidad
Plaza del Vapor, Havana
Havana Plan Piloto

Notes

References

External links

 Digital Photographic Archive of Historic Havana- a digital archive of 1055 significant buildings in the Historic Center of Havana

Architecture in Havana
Buildings and structures in Havana
Tourist attractions in Havana
Neoclassical architecture in Cuba
Architecture in Cuba
History of Havana